The Model 1924/1929D machine gun was a French infantry weapon used on the Maginot Line.

It was a variant of the MAC 24/29, adapted to firing from interior firing ports in the bunkers of the Maginot Line.

Sources
 Philippe Truttman, La Muraille de France ou la Ligne Maginot, Gérard Klopp éditeur, 1985.
 Site sur les armes françaises.

References

Light machine guns
Machine guns of France
7.5×54mm French firearms

fr:Fusil-mitrailleur de 7,5 mm modèle 1924/1929 D
ru:MAC M1924/29